A list of British films released in 1930.

1930

A-K

L-Z

See also
1930 in British music
1930 in British television
1930 in film
1930 in the United Kingdom

References

External links

1930
Films
Lists of 1930 films by country or language
1930s in British cinema